The Carl Friedrich Gauss Prize for Applications of Mathematics is a mathematics award, granted jointly by the International Mathematical Union and the German Mathematical Society for "outstanding mathematical contributions that have found significant applications outside of mathematics". The award receives its name from the German mathematician Carl Friedrich Gauss. With its premiere in 2006, it is to be awarded every fourth year, at the International Congress of Mathematicians.

The previous laureate was presented with a medal and a cash purse of EUR10,000 funded by the International Congress of Mathematicians 1998 budget surplus.

The official announcement of the prize took place on 30 April 2002, the 225th anniversary of the birth of Gauss.  The prize was developed specifically to give recognition to mathematicians; while mathematicians influence the world outside of their field, their studies are often not recognized. The prize aims to honour those who have made contributions and effects in the fields of business, technology, or even day-to-day life.

Laureates

See also
 Fields Medal
 Chern Medal
 List of mathematics awards

References

Awards established in 2006
Awards of the International Mathematical Union
Prize